The Marquessate of Campotéjar was created by Philip IV of Spain in 1643 for , son of the second . The title refers to the village of Campotéjar, in the province of Granada, Spain.
 
Pedro de Granada, 1st Señor of Campotéjar was of a Morisco family, being the grandson of Yaḥyā Abū Zakariyyā al-Naŷŷar (known as Cidi Yahya) who converted to Christianity and was baptised with the name Pedro de Granada during the general conversion of 1500–1501. Cidi Yahya was himself the grandson of Yusuf IV, Emir of Granada.
 
The Emirate of Granada fell to the Christians during the Reconquista in 1492. As a reward for his collaboration Pedro de Granada was given numerous grants by the Catholic monarchs. His descendants were embraced and integrated into the Catholic Spanish nobility.
 
Following the death of the 3rd Marquess in 1660, the title and associated lands including the Generalife and the municipalities of Campotéjar, Jayena and Dehesas Viejas passed to female line descendants, who resided in Genoa, Italy. Spain's attempts to recover the Generalife formed one of the longest judicial processes in Spanish history: it was initiated by Carlos IV of Spain in 1805 and was still in court in 1921.

In 1875 the 17th Marchioness was created a Grandee of Spain. Following the death of the childless 18th Marquess of Campotéjar in 1921 the title did not pass to his nearest heir. The title remained in abeyance until 1951, when a letter of succession was issued in favour of Donna Casilda de Bustos y Figueroa, Duchess of Pastrana, who was unrelated to the previous Marquesses.

Male line ancestors of the Señores of Campotéjar 
 
Muhammad ibn al-Mawl
Yusuf IV, Emir of Granada (c.1370-1432)
Ibn Selim Abraḥem al-Naŷŷar, Wali of Almería (?-aft 1474)
Yaḥyā Abū Zakariyyā al-Naŷŷar (later Pedro de Granada) (c.1442-1506)
Ali Omar ibn Nazar (later Alonso de Granada Venegas) (c.1467-1534)

Señores of Campotéjar 
 
Pedro de Granada Venegas, 1st Señor of Campotéjar (1502-1565)
Alfonso de Granada Venegas, 2nd Señor of Campotéjar (1540-1611)

Marquesses of Campotéjar 
 
Pedro de Granada Venegas, 1st Marquess of Campotéjar (1559-1643)
Ferdinando de Granada Venegas, 2nd Marquess of Campotéjar (?-1649)
Juan de Granada Venegas, 3rd Marquess of Campotéjar (?-1660)
Pietro Lomellini Granada, 4th Marquess of Campotéjar (?-?)
David Lomellini Granada, 5th Marquess of Campotéjar (?-?)
Giovanni Battista Lomellini Granada, 6th Marquess of Campotéjar (?-?)
Elena Lomellini Granada, 7th Marchioness of Campotéjar (?-?)
Maria Margarita Provana Granada Venegas Lomellini, 8th Marchioness of Campotéjar (?-1716)
Pier Francesco Grimaldi, 9th Marquess of Campotéjar (?-abt 1724)
Ansaldo Grimaldi, 10th Marquess of Campotéjar (?-abt 1748)
Giovanni Battista Grimaldi, Doge of Genoa, 11th Marquess of Campotéjar (1673-1757)
Pier Francesco Grimaldi, Doge of Genoa 12th Marquess of Campotéjar (1715-1791)
Giovanni Battista Grimaldi, 13th Marquess of Campotéjar (?-?)
Maria Catarina Grimaldi, 14th Marchioness of Campotéjar (?-1837)
Maddalena Grimaldi, 15th Marchioness de Campotéjar (?-?)
Ignazio Alessandro Pallavicini, 16th Marquess of Campotéjar (1800-1871)
Maria Teresa Maddalena Pallavicini, 17th Marchioness of Campotéjar (1829-1914)
Giacomo Filippo Durazzo Pallavicini, 18th Marquess of Campotéjar (1848-1921)
 
In 1926, following the death of the 18th Marquess and the Spanish recovery of the Generalife, his widow was granted the Marquessate of the Generalife in her own right:
 
Matilde Giustiniani, Marchioness of the Generalife (1878-1970)

The Marquessate of Campotéjar was revived in 1951, though the grantee was unrelated to the previous Marquesses:

Casilda de Bustos y Figueroa, 15th Duchess of Pastrana, 19th Marchioness of Campotéjar (1910-2000)
José Maria Finat y Bustos, 16th Duke of Pastrana, 20th Marquess of Campotéjar (b.1932)
Casilda Finat y Riva, 21st Marchioness of Campotéjar (b.1964)

References

External links
 Dissertation about the Granada Venegas Family 1431-1643
 Manuscript Granada-Venegas family tree by Salazar y Castro
 Genealogical notes on the Granada-Venegas family
 Portraits of family members

Marquesses of Spain
1643 in Spain